The West Indies cricket team toured the Netherlands in May and June 2022 to play three One Day International (ODI) matches. The ODI series formed part of the inaugural 2020–2023 ICC Cricket World Cup Super League. All the matches were played at the VRA Cricket Ground in Amstelveen.

Originally, the series was scheduled to take place in June 2020. However, on 22 April 2020, the Dutch government announced that it had banned all events in the country, both sports and cultural, until 1 September 2020 due to the COVID-19 pandemic. In February 2022, the revised fixtures for the tour were confirmed. It was the first time that the West Indies toured the Netherlands for a three-match ODI series. The West Indies had previously played two 55-over friendly matches in the Netherlands in 1991.

In April 2022, Kieron Pollard announced his retirement from international cricket, with Nicholas Pooran named as the new limited overs captain for the West Indies.

The West Indies won the first ODI match by seven wickets, with Shai Hope scoring 119 not out. The West Indies then won the second match by five wickets, to win the series with a match to spare. The West Indies won the final match by 20 runs to win the series 3–0.

Squads

Rovman Powell and Romario Shepherd were both unable to play for the West Indies due to visa delays. Both players had travelled from India to London following the conclusion of the 2022 Indian Premier League, and did not join up with the rest of the squad.

ODI series

1st ODI

2nd ODI

3rd ODI

References

External links
 Series home at ESPN Cricinfo

2022 in West Indian cricket
2022 in Dutch cricket
International cricket competitions in 2022
International cricket tours of the Netherlands
Cricket events postponed due to the COVID-19 pandemic